Vyacheslav Ruzhentsev (born 6 November 1980) is a retired Ukrainian professional footballer who played as a defender and current football fitness coach.

Career
Ruzhentsev is a product of his native Kyiv's Obolon youth academy system. 

He spent his career in the different Ukrainian clubs of the lower leagues, and from 2009 began to work as a football fitness coach for physical training and rehabilitation.

On 29 August 2021 he was appointed as a fitness coach for the Ukraine national football team.

Honours
Desna Pohreby
 Kyiv Region Cup: 2017

Bucha 
 Ukrainian Amateur Cup: 2011

References

External links
 
Profile at Footballfacts (in Russian)

1980 births
Living people
Ukrainian footballers
Footballers from Kyiv
Association football defenders
FC Dnipro players
FC Dnipro-2 Dnipropetrovsk players
FC Dnipro-3 Dnipropetrovsk players
FC Obolon-Brovar Kyiv players
FC Obolon-2 Kyiv players
FC Dinaz Vyshhorod players
FC Nafkom Brovary players
FC Ros Bila Tserkva players
FC Bucha players
FC Desna Pohreby players
Ukrainian First League players
Ukrainian Second League players
Ukrainian Amateur Football Championship players
Ukrainian football managers
FC Desna Pohreby managers
FC Gandzasar Kapan managers
Expatriate football managers in Armenia
Ukrainian expatriate football managers